Carlos Becke (born 26 June 1994) is a German tennis player.

Becke has a career high ATP doubles ranking of 1485 achieved on 11 July 2016.

Becke made his ATP main draw debut at the 2013 Bet-at-home Cup Kitzbühel in the doubles draw partnering Philipp Kohlschreiber.

External links

1994 births
Living people
German male tennis players
Sportspeople from Hildesheim
Tennis people from Lower Saxony